Evi or EVI may refer to:

People 
 Evi (Midianite king)
 Evi (given name)

Other uses 
 EVI (European Vaccine Initiative)
 Evi (software), a British software developer
 .evi, the filename extension used by Envoy (WordPerfect)
 EVI, the ICAO airline designator for the Royal Australian Air Force's transport squadron No. 34
 Enhanced vegetation index
 Evacuation Immediate, a warning issued through the United States Emergency Alert System
 Electronic Valve Instrument, a fingering mode for the EWI wind controller

See also
 Eevee, a Pokémon
 Eevee (band), a Philippine band formed in 2004
 Evie (disambiguation)
 Eve (disambiguation)
 Ive (disambiguation)
 Ivy (disambiguation)
 Ivey (disambiguation)
 Evy (disambiguation)
 Yve